Rear Admiral John Kodzo Gbenah was a Ghanaian naval personnel and served in the Ghana Navy. He served as Chief of Naval Staff of the Ghana Navy from March 2001 to June 2005.

References

Ghanaian military personnel
Ghana Navy personnel
Chiefs of Naval Staff (Ghana)
National Defence College, India alumni